Richard Agbalegah Zumah (born 15 July 1997) is a Ghanaian footballer who plays as a striker for Amanat Baghdad in the Iraqi Premier League.

Club career
Zumah started playing with Ambah FC, in 2015 moved to Emmanuel City FC and played with them three seasons, and appeared at an excellent level, which led many clubs to put it under its radar. On 23 February 2018 he began his professional career when he moved to Karbalaa FC for a short time and played the 2018 season in the Iraqi Premier League, and quickly merged with the team, scored a goal against Naft Al-Wasat SC, and scored against Al-Quwa Al-Jawiya.
He then returned to Emmanuel City FC, came back to an excellent level and scored several goals for them.

On February 20, 2019, Zumah returned to play in the Iraqi Premier League after moving to Amanat Baghdad Club as a professional player.

References

External links

1997 births
Living people
Ghanaian footballers
Ghanaian expatriate footballers
Association football forwards
Ghana Premier League players
Expatriate footballers in Iraq
Ghanaian expatriates in Iraq
Amanat Baghdad players